Yeshivat Ohr David (or Yeshivat Or David, lit. Light of David Yeshiva) is a Jewish seminary and institute of higher learning located in Jerusalem.

Ohr David is currently located in Ramot. Throughout the year, students take trips throughout Israel and the Israeli-occupied territories, including trips to the Golan Heights and Eilat.

The head of the yeshiva is Rabbi Yosef Granofsky and was founded by Rabbi Chaim Flom in 1980.

References

External links
Website

Schools in Jerusalem
Orthodox yeshivas in Jerusalem
1980 establishments in Israel
Educational institutions established in 1980